Trinchesia acinosa is a species of sea slug, an aeolid nudibranch, a marine gastropod mollusc in the family Trinchesiidae.

Distribution
This species was described from New Caledonia. It has been reported from Japan and the Marshall Islands.

Description 
The typical adult size of this species is 10–12 mm. The body is opaque white and the cerata, rhinophores, front of the head and oral tentacles are pale to bright orange.

References 

Trinchesiidae
Gastropods described in 1928